Kennedy Hinkson (born 21 February 1986), is a professional football player who plays for W Connection F.C. of Trinidad and Tobago, and representing the Grenadian national team. He was called up and debuted internationally on 16 November 2018 during the qualifiers of the CONCACAF Nations League, scoring his first national goal for Grenada in a 5–2 victory against non-FIFA member Saint Martin.

International career

International goals
Scores and results list Grenada's goal tally first.

References

1986 births
Living people
Trinidad and Tobago footballers
Grenadian footballers
W Connection F.C. players
San Juan Jabloteh F.C. players
North East Stars F.C. players
Association football midfielders
Sportspeople from Port of Spain
Grenada international footballers